Lollar Branch is a stream in Franklin County in the U.S. state of Missouri. It is a tributary of Spring Creek.

According to the State Historical Society of Missouri, the namesake of Lollar Branch is unknown.

See also
List of rivers of Missouri

References

Rivers of Franklin County, Missouri
Rivers of Missouri